Zamenga Batukezanga (1933–2000) was a Congolese writer and philanthropist. Zamenga's work explored African culture. He's been named the "most popular Congolese writer" of the Democratic Republic of Congo.

Career 
Zamenga Batukezanga was born  in nkobo- Luozi Bas-Congo, Democratic Republic of Congo. In the 1950s, he did his graduate studies at Mangembo and in 1960, a scholarship allowed him to study at l'Université libre de Bruxelles, in Belgium. Back in Congo in 1965, he was appointed Director of Student Social Work. In 1977, he opened a center for the rehabilitation of young people with physical disabilities (Kikesa), which he headed until 1981. In 1984, he was appointed director general of the National Society of Congolese publishers, composers and authors.

Later life and legacy
Towards the end of the 1980s, Zamenga decided to leave everything. He refused a post at Unesco in 1986 to devote himself entirely to writing and philanthropic works. He spent the last years of his life in his native region, serving the poor.

Every year, the Zamenga Batukezanga Literary Prize is awarded to a Congolese writer under the age of 40.

Selected works
Souvenir du village, 1971 
Bandoki, 1973 
Carte postale, 1974 
Village qui disparaît dans les promesses, 1975 
Les îles Soyo, éditions Zabat, 1979
Lettre d’Amérique, 1980
Un Croco à Luozi, 1980
Psaumes sur le fleuve Zaïre, 1985 
Un Blanc en Afrique, 1988
Pour une démystification: la littérature en Afrique, 1989
Un boy à Pretoria, 1990
Laveur des Cadavres, 1992
Pour un cheveu blanc, posthumous work, 2005
La Mercèdes qui saute le trou, posthumous work, 2005

Award
1985: Grand Prize of the 20th anniversary of the 2nd Republic of Zaire for all of his literary work.

Legagy
 Phambu Ngoma-Binda, Zamenga Batukezanga : Vie et Œuvre, Éditions Saint Paul Afrique, 1990, 80 p 
 Wyatt Mc Gaffey, « Zamenga of Zaire: Novelist, Historian, Sociologist, Philosopher and Moralist », in Research in African Literatures, vol. 13, 2 (Summer, 1982),  Zamenga of Zaire: "Novelist, Historian, Sociologist, Philosopher and Moralist" on JSTOR

References

External links
Zamenga sur congocultures.net
 Larousse à propos de Zamenga Batukezanga

1933 births
2000 deaths
20th-century male writers
People from Kinshasa
Democratic Republic of the Congo poets
Democratic Republic of the Congo writers in French